"Walking on a Dream" is a song by Australian electronic music duo Empire of the Sun, released on 30 August 2008 as the lead single from their debut studio album of the same name (2008). The track was co-written by band members, Luke Steele and Nick Littlemore with Jonathan "Donnie" Sloan. The full Sam La More remix was made available as a free download on the band's official website.

On the Australian ARIA Charts, it reached number ten, and was certified double platinum to indicate shipment of over 140,000 units. It was listed at number four in the 2008 Triple J Hottest 100 popularity poll. "Walking on a Dream" won the category for Single of the Year at the ARIA Music Awards of 2009, and, in the following year, it won Dance Work of the Year at the APRA Awards. Although the single was originally due for release in the United Kingdom on 9 February 2009, the date was postponed until 6 July. In Europe, it reached number eight in both Belgium and Ireland; and peaked in the top 100 on the  UK Singles Chart. The song was made the Single of the Week on the iTunes Store for the week of 21 April 2009. The song was also featured in the 2012 racing video game Forza Horizon and later in the 2016 Honda Civic "The Dreamer" commercial, which helped revive the song in the charts, with the song debuting on the US Billboard Hot 100 after more than seven years of release, peaking at number 65.

Background 

Luke Steele (of The Sleepy Jackson) and Nick Littlemore (of Pnau) formed Empire of the Sun as an electronic duo in 2007. Their debut release, "Walking on a Dream", appeared as a single on 30 August 2008 ahead of the album of same name on 3 October. Steele had assisted on tracks, "With You Forever" and "Freedom", for Pnau's self-titled album, which was issued in December 2007. As Empire of the Sun, the duo recorded material for Walking on a Dream, including the title track, at Soundworks Music Studio and Linear Recording in Sydney during various sessions throughout the latter part of that year. The track was co-written by Littlemore and Steele with Jonathan Sloan. Sloan also co-produced the album with the duo and Littlemore's bandmate, Peter Mayes of Pnau.

Sam Littlemore (Nick's older brother) aka Sam La More remixed the track, which was made available as a free download on the album's official website until December 2008.

The song uses an interpolation of Billy Ocean's "Caribbean Queen". Where Billy says "And our hearts they beat as one", Empire of the Sun's lyric is "...When two people become one".

Chart performance

The song was in a Honda Civic commercial in the U.S. in 2016, more than seven years after its original release. This led the song to finally chart in the country, making it their first Alternative Songs hit there. On May 14, 2016, the re-released single reached number one on Billboard's Dance Club Songs chart, seven years after having peaked at number 18 in its first chart run.

Music video

The music video for the song was shot by Josh Logue on location along the Bund in Shanghai, China, in July–August 2008, just prior to the 2008 Summer Olympics in Beijing. It features Steele and Littlemore wearing Eastern costumes and makeup, inspired by Peking Opera.

Track listings

Charts

Weekly charts

Year-end charts

Certifications

ć

Release history

See also
 "The Thrill"
 List of number-one dance singles of 2016 (U.S.)

References

2007 songs
2008 debut singles
APRA Award winners
ARIA Award-winning songs
Astralwerks singles
Capitol Records singles
EMI Records singles
Empire of the Sun (band) songs
Music videos shot in China
Songs written by Luke Steele (musician)
Songs written by Nick Littlemore